Jonas Baumann (born March 27, 1990) is a cross-country skier from Switzerland. He competed for Switzerland at the 2014 Winter Olympics in the cross-country skiing events.

Cross-country skiing results
All results are sourced from the International Ski Federation (FIS).

Olympic Games

Distance reduced to 30 km due to weather conditions.

World Championships

World Cup

Season standings

References

External links

1990 births
Living people
Olympic cross-country skiers of Switzerland
Cross-country skiers at the 2014 Winter Olympics
Cross-country skiers at the 2018 Winter Olympics
Cross-country skiers at the 2022 Winter Olympics
Swiss male cross-country skiers
Tour de Ski skiers
Sportspeople from Graubünden